Geoffrey Patrick Dolan (known as Geoff Dolan) (born 29 December 1964 in Lower Hutt, New Zealand) is a New Zealand actor, singer and corporate entertainer who is probably best known in recent times as recurring character, Derrick/Thor in The Almighty Johnsons. He resides in Auckland.

Geoffrey hails from Wainuiomata. Geoff is also a popular corporate entertainer, singer and stage performer. His voice can be heard on many commercials on New Zealand television.

Filmography

Film
 Chunuk Bair (1992) .... Machine Gunner
 Typhon's People (1993) (TV) .... Maitre D
 Lawless (1999) (TV) .... Detective Sergeant Dave Bruford
 Lawless: Dead Evidence (2000) (TV)  .... Detective Sergeant Dave Bruford
 Lawless: Beyond Justice (2001) (TV)  .... Detective Sergeant Dave Bruford
 No One Can Hear You (2001) .... Deputy Phil
 Grace (2002)
 Cheesey Goodness(2004)........Billy the Kid
 In My Father's Den (2004) .... O'Neill
 Spooked (2004) .... Simmonds
 Hugh and Heke (2006)....Hugh
 Sione's Wedding (2006)...Drunk singing in Jail
 X (2022).... Deputy

TV Work
 Gloss as Neil Palmer (1987)
Shark in the Park as Wayne Hassett (1989)
Riding High as Paul Frazer (1995)
Hercules: The Legendary Journeys as Orent / Henchman / Fashion Police Officer (1997, 1999; 3 episodes)
Xena: Warrior Princess as Odd-job Man #1 (2000; 1 episode)
Jack of All Trades as Lucianni (2000; 1 episode)
Mercy Peak 
 What She Least Expected (2001) - Ross Duval 
Mataku
 The Fishing Trip (2002) .... Ron
Power Rangers Ninja Storm
 Storm Before the Calm: Part 1 (2003)  .... Official
 Storm Before the Calm: Part 2 (2003)  .... Official
Power Rangers Dino Thunder
 Strange Relations (2004) (voice) .... Jade Gladiator
Power Rangers S.P.D.
 Endings: Part 2 (2005) (voice) .... Omni
 Endings: Part 1 (2005) (voice) .... Omni
 Missing (2005) (voice) .... Herock
Power Rangers Mystic Force (2006) TV Series (voice) Koragg the Knight Wolf & other monsters
Kai Korero as Ken (2006) TV Series
Power Rangers Jungle Fury (2008) TV Series (voice) Dai Shi (spirit/monster form)
Outrageous Fortune (2010) Steve Brownlow (2 episodes)
The Almighty Johnsons (2011) as Derrick/Thor
Power Rangers Samurai
 Clash of the Red Rangers (2011) (voice) .... Sergeant Tread
Power Rangers Megaforce (2013) TV Series (voice) .... Gosei
Power Rangers Ninja Steel (2017) .... Charity Worker
Power Rangers Beast Morphers (2020) Koragg the Knight Wolf (Redubbed archive footage)
Power Rangers Dino Fury (2021) Reaghoul

References

External links
 https://archive.today/20130222095724/http://www.triciakelly.net/Hugh-and-Heke.html
 http://www.geoffreydolan.com
 https://www.imdb.com/name/nm0230781/
 http://www.tv.com/geoff-dolan/person/109666/summary.html

Living people
1964 births
New Zealand male film actors
New Zealand male television actors
New Zealand male voice actors
People from Lower Hutt